Hellmut is a given name. Notable people with the name include:

Hellmut Andics (1922–1998), Austrian journalist, publicist, and writer
Hellmut Bunge (1920–2006), Hauptmann in the Wehrmacht during World War II, recipient of the Knight's Cross of the Iron Cross
Hellmut von der Chevallerie (1896–1965), General of the Infantry in the German Wehrmacht during the World War II
Sigismund Hellmut von Dawans (1899–1944), general in the Wehrmacht during World War II, recipient of the German Cross in Gold
Hellmut Diwald (1924–1993), German historian and Professor of Medieval and Modern History at the University of Erlangen-Nuremberg
Hellmut Federhofer (1911–2014), Austrian musicologist
Hellmut Flashar (born 1929), German philologist and translator
Hellmut Fritzsche (born 1927), American physicist
Hellmut Geissner (1926–2012), German scholar of speech and rhetoric
Hellmut von Gerlach (1866–1935), German journalist and politician
Hellmut G. Haasis (born 1942), German historian, author, and broadcaster
Hellmut Hattler (born 1952), German jazz and bass player
Hellmut Kerutt (1916–2000), Major in the Fallschirmjäger during World War II and an Oberst in the Bundeswehr
Hans Hellmut Kirst (1914–1989), German novelist and the author of 46 books
Hellmut Kneser (1898–1973), Baltic German mathematician who made notable contributions to group theory and topology
Hellmut Krug (born 1956), retired German football referee
Hellmut Lange (1923–2011), actor and journalist who became famous as action hero on TV
Hellmut Lantschner (1909–1993), Austrian and German alpine skier and world champion
Hellmut von Leipzig (born 1921), Leutnant der Reserve of the Brandenburgers in the Wehrmacht during World War II
Hellmut Maneval (1898–1967), German international footballer
Hellmut May (1921–2011), figure skater who represented Austria at the Winter Olympics in 1936 and 1948
Hellmut Röhnisch (1914–1996), universal language activist, businessman and athlete
Hellmut Rohweder (1914–2008), German chief engineer on a U-boat in World War II and recipient of the Knight's Cross of the Iron Cross
Hellmut Schmid (1914–1998), Professor of geodesy and photogrammetry on the ETH Zürich (Switzerland)
Hellmut Seibt (1929–1992), Austrian figure skater
Hellmut Ludwig Späth (1885–1945), the sixth and last manager of the Späth nursery on the death of his father in 1913
Hellmut Wilhelm (1905–1990), German sinologist known for his broad knowledge of both Chinese literature and Chinese history
Hellmut Wolff (1906–1986), German academic, mystic, Germanic revivalist, and most notably a Pendulum dowser

See also
Hellmut Seibt Memorial "Hellmut Seibt Memorial 2014 Interclub
Helmut
Hellmuth
Helmuth